Mikhail Youzhny and Mischa Zverev were the defending champions, but Youzhny chose not to participate, and only Zverev competed that year.
Zverev partnered with Nicolas Kiefer, but they withdrew before their semifinal match against Andreas Beck and Marco Chiudinelli, due to an abdominal muscle tear for Kiefer.

Christopher Kas and Philipp Kohlschreiber won in the final 6–3, 6–4, against Andreas Beck and Marco Chiudinelli.

Seeds

Draw

Draw

References

External links
Draw

Doubles